The 1997–98 season was the 100th season of competitive football played by Arsenal. Managed by Arsène Wenger in his first full season, the club ended the campaign winning the league championship for the first time in seven years. At Wembley Stadium, Arsenal beat Newcastle United 2–0 in the 1998 FA Cup Final to win the competition and complete a domestic double – the second in the club's history and the first since 1970–71. Arsenal exited the League Cup in the semi-finals to Chelsea and lost on aggregate score to PAOK in the UEFA Cup first round.

In the transfer window, Arsenal purchased several players, including midfielders Marc Overmars and Emmanuel Petit and goalkeeper Alex Manninger; English midfielder Paul Merson departed to join Middlesbrough. Arsenal began the league season relatively well, but a run of three defeats in four matches between November and December 1997 left the team in sixth position before Christmas, and seemingly out of championship contention. Although they were 12 points behind reigning champions Manchester United at the end of February, a winning streak of ten matches ensured Arsenal won the championship with a 4–0 win over Everton on 3 May 1998.

In recognition of the team's achievement, Wenger was awarded the Carling Manager of the Year award and striker Dennis Bergkamp was given the accolade of PFA Players' Player of the Year by his fellow peers and FWA Footballer of the Year by football writers.

Background

In the 1996–97 season, Arsenal contested in the Premier League. The club, having dismissed manager Bruce Rioch before the beginning of the league season, appointed French manager Arsène Wenger, in a contract worth £2 million. Arsenal led the league table for much of November, but defeat to Nottingham Forest on 21 December 1996 concurred with no wins in December. Two draws and defeats in February moved Arsenal into fourth position; a previous defeat to Liverpool at home a month earlier left Wenger ruling the club out of the title race. On the final day of the season, Arsenal beat Derby County 3–1 at the Baseball Ground, finishing third on goal difference. The team, thus, qualified for the UEFA Cup, missing out on UEFA Champions League qualification to second place Newcastle United.

Transfers
The major departure of the 1997–98 season for Arsenal was midfielder Paul Merson, who joined Middlesbrough in a £4.5 million deal, replacing Juninho. Wenger said of the move, "You are never happy to lose a player of his calibre but it is a good deal for him and for the club." Middlesbrough intended to sign David Platt, but a move never came to fruition, as talks broke down between both parties. Defender Matthew Rose and goalkeeper Lee Harper joined Queens Park Rangers for a combined fee of £750,000.

Arriving first during the summer was English defender Matthew Upson from Luton Town. French midfielders Emmanuel Petit and Gilles Grimandi joined from Monaco, where they were protégées to Wenger. Marc Overmars, a midfielder from Ajax, was recruited in a £7 million deal and spoke of his delight at joining Arsenal in his press conference: "I like English football because there is more space. With my speed and quality I think it will be good for me here." Deals for midfielders Luís Boa Morte and Alberto Méndez striker Christopher Wreh and goalkeeper Alex Manninger were also finalised before August.

In

Out

Pre-season
Key

Green colour = Win

Red colour = Loss

Premier League

August–October
Arsenal's league campaign started on 9 August 1997 with an away fixture at Leeds United. The match ended in a 1–1 draw; Ian Wright scored his first goal of the season, before a mix up in defence meant Leeds striker Jimmy Floyd Hasselbaink equalised for the home team. Two days later, Wright scored both goals in Arsenal's 2–0 win at home to Coventry City, leaving him one goal away from equalling Cliff Bastin's club goalscoring record. The following week, two goals from Dennis Bergkamp and a debut goal from Marc Overmars helped Arsenal to win at Southampton. In spite of Bergkamp scoring a hat-trick against Leicester City, Arsenal drew the match 3–3, having conceded a third in the sixth minute of stoppage time. A further draw, at home to rivals Tottenham Hotpsur, for whom defender Sol Campbell particularly impressed, meant Arsenal ended August in fifth position.

Wright scored his 179th goal for Arsenal against Bolton Wanderers and broke the club goal-scoring record with his first of three goals in a 4–1 win at Highbury. Manager Arsène Wenger praised the striker's achievement, adding "He is fantastic for the timing of his movement. It is so intelligent when he has not got the ball." Arsenal faced Chelsea at Stamford Bridge on 21 September 1997; at 2–2, a late goal by left-back Nigel Winterburn from 25 yards ended the home team's resistance, who went down to ten men after Frank Leboeuf was sent off. September ended with a third consecutive win, against West Ham United. Goals from Bergkamp, Wright and Overmars helped Arsenal move to the top of the league table, one point above champions Manchester United. The month ended with a 2–2 draw against Everton at Goodison Park; Wright and Overmars scored Arsenal's goals. October began with a 5–0 win at home to promoted Barnsley, but two goalless draws – first at Crystal Palace and then to Aston Villa - meant Manchester United moved a point ahead of Arsenal.

November–February
Arsenal's first fixture of November was against Derby County at the newly built Pride Park Stadium. Arsenal were awarded a penalty kick in the first half after Patrick Vieira was fouled by Lee Carsley; Wright hit the penalty, which ricocheted off the crossbar. Two goals by Paulo Wanchope and a late strike by Dean Sturridge condemned Arsenal to their first defeat of the league season. When Arsenal played Manchester United on 9 November, they needed a win to stay one point behind the league leaders. Wenger admitted in his pre-match comments that a second successive defeat would make it "difficult" for them to catch Manchester United, but not "impossible". Striker Nicolas Anelka, standing in for Bergkamp, scored his first goal for Arsenal and Vieira added a second, leaving goalkeeper Peter Schmeichel rattled. Although Teddy Sheringham scored twice for Manchester United to level the score, midfielder David Platt headed into the far corner with seven minutes left of the match to score the winner for Arsenal. Wenger said of the win: "This result is good for the English game because it will stimulate interest in the Premier League" and opposing manager Alex Ferguson half agreed: "A one-horse race is not good for the game." Arsenal failed to capitalise on the result, losing to Sheffield Wednesday and Liverpool in a period where the team were depleted due to injuries.

A goal from Wright against Newcastle United, his first in seven matches, was enough to earn victory away at St James' Park. Arsenal lost 1–3 to Blackburn Rovers the following week, denting their chances of closing the gap on leaders Manchester United. The match was overshadowed by Wright being booed off by supporters because of his performance, who responded by appearing "at the window of the east stand clad in vest and underpants haranguing the crowd." Arsenal began the Christmas period with a fixture against Wimbledon; the game was abandoned by referee Dermot Gallagher due to floodlight failure and rescheduled for a later date. On Boxing Day, an own goal by Steve Walsh helped Arsenal beat Leicester City 2–1 at Highbury. A draw at Tottenham Hotspur, who were welcoming the return of Jürgen Klinsmann, left Arsenal in sixth at the end of the calendar year, 12 points behind Manchester United.

In the first league match of 1998, Overmars scored twice to earn Arsenal a win against Leeds United. The team drew 2–2 at Coventry City a week later, losing more ground at the top of the table. January came to a conclusion with a 3–0 victory over Southampton, with all three goals scored in the space of seven minutes. A further two wins in February, at home to Chelsea and Crystal Palace, moved Arsenal into second place, nine points behind Manchester United, albeit having played two games less.

March–May
Arsenal dropped two points against West Ham United on 2 March with a goalless draw at Upton Park. The following match, they closed the gap to six points after Manchester United could also only manage to draw against West Ham, but dropped to third position. A goal from Christopher Wreh in the rescheduled match at Wimbledon was enough to move Arsenal into second and set up a title clash between themselves and Manchester United on 14 March 1998. The result, moreover, reopened betting after Manchester bookmaker Fred Done decided to pay out on punters who backed Manchester United. After numerous attempts to break the deadlock in the match, Arsenal scored with 15 minutes left of the match; Overmars latched onto a header by Anelka and managed to flick the ball beyond the goalkeeper. When asked which team was in the best position going into the final games of the season, Wenger told Sky Sports that United had a "small advantage" over the rest; Ferguson, however, warned that it would be "inevitable" for Arsenal to drop points. Two 1–0 wins, first at home to Sheffield Wednesday and then Bolton Wanderers, meant Arsenal kept an eighth successive clean sheet, a new league record.

Arsenal beat Newcastle United 3–1 to move within four points of Manchester United in early April. The return of Bergkamp from a three-match suspension helped Arsenal to trounce Blackburn Rovers; the team scored three goals in the space of the opening 14 minutes. Manchester United's failure to beat Newcastle United meant Arsenal went top of the league table after beating Wimbledon 5–0. Victory against Barnsley and then at home against Derby County four days later meant Arsenal needed one more win become league champions, regardless of Manchester United's results. Although Bergkamp was ruled out for the remainder of the season after sustaining an injury against Derby, Arsenal eased to a 4–0 win against Everton to become the first club other than Manchester United or Blackburn Rovers to win the Premier League. With a run of ten straight victories, a new record, was set, and Wenger became the first non-British manager to lead a team to win the league championship. Arsenal lost their final two matches of the league season, choosing to rest players for the upcoming FA Cup Final.

Match results

League table

Results summary

Results by round

FA Cup

Arsenal entered the competition in the third round, receiving a bye as a Premier League club. Their opening match was a goalless draw against First Division club Port Vale at home, meaning the game was replayed at Vale Park eleven days later. Arsenal won the replay 4–3 in a penalty shoot-out, having drawn 1–1 in extra time. In the fourth round, Arsenal played Middlesbrough at the Riverside Stadium. Overmars scored the opening goal inside 68 seconds for the visitors and Parlour added a second to give Arsenal a commanding lead going into the interval. Although Paul Merson scored in the second half for Middlesbrough, Arsenal did enough to progress into the fifth round. A 0–0 draw at home against Crystal Palace meant Arsenal needed to play a fifth round replay at Selhurst Park on 25 February. Goals from Anelka and Bergkamp ensured victory for an under-strength Arsenal team. Against West Ham United in the quarter-finals, Arsenal conceded the first goal when Frank Lampard's corner kick was converted into the goal net by Ian Pearce through a first-time shot. Although Bergkamp scored a penalty to equalise, Arsenal had to settle for a replay at Upton Park, which ended 4–3 on penalties after another draw. A goal from Wreh against Wolverhampton Wanderers in the semi-finals meant Arsenal reached their 13th FA Cup final.

On 16 May 1998, Arsenal contested the 1998 FA Cup Final against Newcastle United. Without first-choice striker Bergkamp, Wenger partnered Anelka with Wreh, leaving Wright on the substitutes bench. Arsenal scored in the 23rd minute; Overmars sprinted onto a pass from Petit, and used his pace to get past Alessandro Pistone and toe-poke the ball between goalkeeper Shay Given's legs. Anelka scored in the second half, from a pass by Parlour to settle the match. In his post-match interview, Wenger praised the "remarkable" Overmars: "[It is] even more so when you realise that he has scored so many goals in important games that we needed to win."

League Cup

Arsenal entered the Football League Cup in the third round along with the other clubs playing in European football, and were drawn at home to First Division club Birmingham City. The tie ended 1–1 after normal time; goals from Luís Boa Morte, Platt and Alberto Méndez helped Arsenal win 4–1 in extra time. They needed extra time the following round to beat Coventry City, and in the fifth round, beat West Ham United 2–1 at Upton Park. Arsenal exited the competition in the semi-finals, losing 4–3 on aggregate to Chelsea.

UEFA Cup

Arsenal entered the UEFA Cup first round, having finished third in the league the previous season. They were drawn to play PAOK, a Greek club noted for hooligan problems. Arsenal lost the first leg 1–0 at the Toumba Stadium, with midfielder Kostas Frantzeskos scoring the winner. Although Bergkamp levelled the game on aggregate score 22 minutes into the second leg, a late goal scored by Zisis Vryzas meant Arsenal did not progress past the first round for the second successive season. Wenger later commented that he was not too unhappy about the team's exit, by saying "To be honest, the only European competition that really interests me is the Champions League".

Awards
In recognition of the team's achievement, Wenger was awarded the Carling Manager of the Year award, saying he was "very proud and honoured" after collecting the prize. Bergkamp was given the accolade of PFA Players' Player of the Year by his fellow peers and FWA Footballer of the Year by football writers.

Player statistics
Numbers in parentheses denote appearances as substitute.
Players with name struck through and marked  left the club during the playing season.

Source:

See also

 1997–98 in English football
 List of Arsenal F.C. seasons

Notes

References

External links
 Wenger completes his first Double at Arsenal.com

Arsenal F.C. seasons
Ars
1998